The Janice Dickinson Modeling Agency, or TJDMA, was a reality television series that debuted on Oxygen on June 6, 2006. The show completed four seasons, through which it followed the self-proclaimed world's first supermodel Janice Dickinson as she took on the role of a modeling agent to her own eponymous agency, also called The Janice Dickinson Modeling Agency, which opened for business in November 2005.

Summary

Season 1

Janice Dickinson decides to open her own self-titled modeling agency. She works in collaboration with business partner Peter Hamm to handle the affairs of the agency, yet creative differences set them apart.

The show begins when Janice holds an open call in her original location, responded by approximately 500 model-wannabes. After hiring 5 amateur models, the location of the agency moves to a bigger area. Janice finds a partner in Peter Hamm, who causes conflicts between her, himself and the subsequent models that get hired. As time passes, the agency suffers financial loss as Janice reveals she has been borrowing money from Peter to fund the agency, and in order to survive, several models are to be retrenched. At the end of the season, the agency launches their billboard at Sunset Boulevard, and zed cards are administered to the new roster of models.

Season 2

The increasing popularity of the agency leads Janice to becoming busier. She returns from vacation only to find some models upset at how Peter has been handling their careers.

When the original roster is affected after some models leave, Janice decides to open another open call, and the overwhelming response has Janice confident that her new roster will be fresher than before, causing jealousy between the existing models and the new models. The season features the infamous AussieBum incident, where Janice is fired after speaking ill of her AussieBum client off-camera, and the inspirational coming out of ex-Survivor contestant J. P. Calderon through a gay magazine.

Season 3

Janice sets history in the modeling world by opening her very own Latin Division as well as her third open casting. Promising models TJ Wilk and Stina Jeffers leave the agency, the former being unsatisfied with Peter Hamm's work ethics, and the latter having signed to Ford Models. Another open call introduces several new models. Janice hints opening an agency branch at Miami. Her business relationship with Peter is finally put to an end when complications put her credibility with clients at jeopardy.

Season 4

The 4th season premiered on August 26, 2008. This season sees Janice close down her property at Hollywood and Highland and move her agency to a villa titled the Model House, where she will live with a select number of her existing and new models. Halfway through the season, a request for plus-size models is made by a client which Janice eventually chose not to refuse, though she becomes abrasive and intolerant over the three new plus-size models her son Nathan introduces to the agency.

During the fourth season finale, Janice announced her plans to move to New York City to truly and officially pursue her dreams of making a high fashion boutique agency. After firing the plus-size models as well as a popular existing model, Traci Moslenko, the future of the LA agency is currently dim, along with the fact of whether the existing models will stay or leave. Janice chose Crystal Truheart to model in the upcoming New York agency, and took in JP as the head of the agency's male division.

After four seasons, the show was not renewed, implying the failure of the New York division and the closure of the agency brand.

Models as of the end of Season 1

The "Management Board" roster

New Faces 

 1 Ages are according to The Janice Dickinson Modeling Agency's model profiles and are presumed to be correct at the time of filming.

Season 2 models

Existing

New Faces

Models as of Season 3

Models as of Season 4

 1 Fired by Janice in Season 4, Episode 9.

See also
 List of modeling agencies

References

External links
 
 Burke, Bill. "Tough love: Janice Dickinson reveals kinder, gentler side on 'Modeling Agency'", The Edge, Boston Herald, 26 August 2008.

 
Modeling agencies
2006 American television series debuts
2000s American reality television series
2000s American LGBT-related television series
Modeling-themed reality television series
Oxygen (TV channel) original programming
Television series by Fremantle (company)
2008 American television series endings
American LGBT-related reality television series